Aguinaldo Roberto Gallon, sometimes known as Guina or Quinha, is a former Brazilian footballer.

At 19 he was the top scorer of the 1977 South American Youth Championship and the 1977 FIFA World Youth Championship held in Tunisia, scoring four goals in each competition.

During his career, he played for CR Vasco da Gama, Real Murcia, C.F. Os Belenenses, C.D. Tenerife and Elche CF.

Achievements
Brazil
 FIFA World Youth Championship top scorer: 1977
 South American Youth Championship top scorer: 1977

Vasco de Gama
 Campeonato Carioca: Winner 1977
 Taça Guanabara: Winner 1977

Real Murcia
 Segunda División: Winner 1982–1983, 1985–1986

References

External links

1958 births
Living people
Brazilian footballers
Brazil under-20 international footballers
Brazilian expatriate footballers
CR Vasco da Gama players
Real Murcia players
C.F. Os Belenenses players
CD Tenerife players
Elche CF players
Primeira Liga players
Segunda División players
Expatriate footballers in Spain
Expatriate footballers in Portugal
Comercial Futebol Clube (Ribeirão Preto) players
Association football midfielders
People from Ribeirão Preto
Footballers from São Paulo (state)